Marquinhos, full name Marcos Aoás Corrêa (born 1994), Brazilian footballer playing for Paris Saint-Germain.

Marquinhos or Marquinho is a diminutive name of Marcos or Marcus, may refer to:

Marquinhos 
Marcos Antônio Abdalla Leite (born 1952), Brazilian basketball player
Marcus Alfredo de Araújo (born 1972), Brazilian footballer playing in Israel
Marquinhos (footballer, born 1961), full name Marco Antonio Carmo Anjos, Brazilian footballer
Marquinhos (footballer, born 1966), full name Marco Antonio da Silva, Brazilian footballer
Marquinhos (footballer, born 1971), full name Marcos Corrêa dos Santos, Brazilian footballer
Marquinhos (footballer, born 1976), full name Marcos Gomes de Araujo, Brazilian footballer
Marquinhos (footballer, born 1981), full name Marcos Vicente dos Santos, Brazilian footballer
Marquinhos (footballer, born April 1982), full name Marcos Antônio Malachias Júnior, Brazilian-born Bulgarian footballer
Marquinhos (footballer, born August 1982), full name Marcos Aurélio Lima Barros, Brazilian footballer
Marquinhos (footballer, born October 1982), full name Marcos Roberto da Silva Barbosa, Brazilian footballer
Marquinhos (footballer, born June 1989), full name Marco da Silva Ignácio, Brazilian footballer
Marquinhos (footballer, born October 1989), full name Marcos Antônio da Silva Gonçalves, Brazilian footballer
Marquinhos (footballer, born 1992), full name Marcos Vinícius Bento, Brazilian footballer
Marquinhos (footballer, born January 1997), full name Marcos Vinícius Sousa Natividade, Brazilian footballer
Marquinhos (footballer, born 1999), full name José Marcos Costa Martins, Brazilian footballer
Marquinhos (footballer, born 2003), full name Marcus Vinicius Oliveira Alencar, Brazilian football forward
Marquinhos Cambalhota (born 1984), full name Weimar Marcos Rodrigues, Brazilian footballer
Marquinhos Carioca (born 1992), full name Marcus Vinícius Vidal Cunha, Brazilian footballer
Marquinhos Caruaru (born 1977), full name Marcos José Franklin Macena de Melo, Brazilian footballer
Marquinhos Gabriel (born 1990), full name Marcos Gabriel do Nascimento, Brazilian footballer who plays for Corinthians
Marquinhos Moraes (born 1991), full name Marcos dos Santos Moraes, Brazilian footballer
Marquinhos Paraná (born 1977), full name Antônio Marcos da Silva Filho, Brazilian footballer
Marquinhos Pedroso (born 1993), full name Marcos Garbellotto Pedroso, Brazilian footballer
Marquinhos Santos (born 1979), Brazilian football manager
Marquinhos do Sul (born 1994), Brazilian footballer who plays as a winger for Brazilian club Vasco da Gama
Marquinhos Vieira (born 1984), Brazilian basketball player

Marquinho 
Marcus Vinícius (footballer, born 1983), full name Marcus Vinícius da Cruz Alves Nóbrega, Brazilian footballer, also known as "Marquinho"
Marquinho (footballer, born 1966), full name Marco Antônio dos Santos, Brazilian footballer
Marquinho (footballer, born 1976), full name Marcos Bonifacio da Rocha, Brazilian footballer
Marquinho (footballer, born 1982), full name Marco Aurélio Pereira Alves, Brazilian footballer 
Marquinho (footballer, born July 1986), full name Marco Antônio de Mattos Filho, Brazilian footballer
Marquinho (footballer, born August 1986), full name Marco Aurélio Iube, Brazilian footballer
Marquinho (footballer, born 1989), full name Marco Gomes Rodrigues, Portuguese footballer
Marquinho (footballer, born 2002), full name Marco Antonio Marsulo Junior, Brazilian footballer
Marquinho (futsal player), (born 1974) Brazilian futsal player

Other 
Marquinho, Paraná, a location in Brazil (see List of municipalities in Paraná)

See also
Marcão (disambiguation)
Marcos (disambiguation)